State Route 354 (SR 354) is a state highway in Washington County, Tennessee. It connects Jonesborough with Boones Creek.

Route description
SR 354 begins at an intersection with US 11E/US 321/SR 34 in Jonesborough and continues north to an intersection with I-26/US 23 in the Boones Creek neighborhood of North Johnson City and ends at an intersection with SR 36 in Boones Creek.

Major intersections

See also
 
 
 List of state routes in Tennessee

References

354
Transportation in Washington County, Tennessee